Polonia-Express is an East German film directed by Kurt Jung-Alsen. It was released in 1957.

Cast
 Alice Graf as Hella Merkel
 Horst Schön as Fritz Marr
 Gerhard Bienert as Wilhelm Merkel
 Martin Flörchinger as Ralow
 Rudolf Ulrich as Althoff
 Hans Klering as Schwerte
 Harry Gillmann as Riemer
 Hans-Peter Minetti as Lehnert

References

External links
 

1957 films
East German films
1950s German-language films
German black-and-white films
Films directed by Kurt Jung-Alsen
1950s German films